Biometeorology is the interdisciplinary field of science that studies the interactions between the biosphere and the Earth's atmosphere on time scales of the order of seasons or shorter (in contrast with bioclimatology).

Examples of relevant processes
Weather events influence biological processes on short time scales. For instance, as the Sun rises above the horizon in the morning, light levels become sufficient for the process of photosynthesis to take place in plant leaves. Later on, during the day, air temperature and humidity may induce the partial or total closure of the stomata, a typical response of many plants to limit the loss of water through transpiration. More generally, the daily evolution of meteorological variables controls the circadian rhythm of plants and animals alike.

Living organisms, for their part, can collectively affect weather patterns. The rate of evapotranspiration of forests, or of any large vegetated area for that matter, contributes to the release of water vapor in the atmosphere. This local, relatively fast and continuous process may contribute significantly to the persistence of precipitations in a given area. As another example, the wilting of plants results in definite changes in leaf angle distribution and therefore modifies the rates of reflection, transmission and absorption of solar light in these plants. That, in turn, changes the albedo of the ecosystem as well as the relative importance of the sensible and latent heat fluxes from the surface to the atmosphere. For an example in oceanography, consider the release of dimethyl sulfide by biological activity in sea water and its impact on atmospheric aerosols.

Human biometeorology
The methods and measurements traditionally used in biometeorology are not different when applied to study the interactions between human bodies and the atmosphere, but some aspects or applications may have been explored more extensively. For instance, wind chill has been investigated to determine the time period an individual can sustain exposure to given temperature and wind conditions. Another important example concerns the study of airborne allergens (such as pollens and aerosols) and their impact on individuals: weather conditions can favor or hinder the release as well as the transport and deposition of these allergens, sometimes severely affecting the well-being of sensitive populations.

See also
International Journal of Biometeorology
International Society of Biometeorology
Gaia hypothesis

Weather's health effects:
Health effects of smog
Thunderstorm asthma
Weather pains

References
R. E. Munn (1970) Biometeorological Methods, Academic Press, New York, 336 pp., Library of Congress Catalog Card Number 71-97488.

External links
Global Bioweather
Dutch bioweather site

Branches of meteorology
Ecology
Environmental science